Prva plovidba (trans. The First Sail) is the debut studio album from Serbian and former Yugoslav rock band Galija.

Predrag Milosavljević, brother of the band frontman Nenad Milosavljević, appeared on the album on vocals, but was credited only as a guest. He became the official band member after the release of Galija's second album, Druga plovidba.

Track listing
The A side of the album was entitled Isplovljenje (Sail Out), and the B side was entitled Uplovljenje (Sail In).

Isplovljenje
"Avanturista" (N. Milosavljević, G. Ljubisavljević, P. Milosavljević) – 4:26
"Letnja pesma" (N. Milosavljević, G. Ljubisavljević, P. Milosavljević) – 4:36
"Pesma za dobro jutro" (N. Milosavljević, G. Ljubisavljević, P. Milosavljević) – 3:15
"Posrednik" (N. Milosavljević, P. Milosavljević) – 7:32

Uplovljenje
"Mađioničar" (N. Milosavljević) - 4:43
"Gospi" (N. Milosavljević) – 4:52
"Decimen" (N. Milosavljević, G. Ljubisavljević, P. Milosavljević) – 9:45

Personnel
Nenad Milosavljević - vocals, acoustic guitar, harmonica
Goran Ljubisavljević - guitar
Predrag Branković - bass guitar
Ljubodrag Vukadinović - keyboards
Boban Pavlović - drums

Guest musicians
Predrag Milosavljević - vocals

References 
 EX YU ROCK enciklopedija 1960-2006,  Janjatović Petar;  

Galija albums
1979 debut albums
PGP-RTB albums